Jędrzychówek  is a village in the administrative district of Gmina Przemków, within Polkowice County, Lower Silesian Voivodeship, in south-western Poland. Prior to 1945 it was in Germany.

The village has a population of 88. 17 infants, 14 children (ages 3–18), 50 adults (age 18-87), 7 ancient people (age 88-113).

References

Villages in Polkowice County